The University of Michigan Executive System, or UMES, a batch operating system developed at the University of Michigan in 1958, was widely used at many universities. Based on the General Motors Executive System for the IBM 701, UMES was revised to work on the mainframe computers in use at the University of Michigan during this time (IBM 704, 709, and 7090) and to work better for the small student jobs that were expected to be the primary work load at the University.

UMES was in use at the University of Michigan until 1967, when MTS was phased in to take advantage of the newer virtual memory time-sharing technology that became available on the IBM System/360 Model 67.

Programming languages available 
 FORTRAN
 MAD (programming language)

See also 
 Timeline of operating systems
 History of IBM mainframe operating systems
 FORTRAN Monitor System
 Bell Operating System (BESYS) or Bell Monitor (BELLMON)
 SHARE Operating System (SOS)
 IBM 7090/94 IBSYS
 Compatible Time-Sharing System (CTSS)
 Michigan Terminal System (MTS)
 Hardware: IBM 701, IBM 704, IBM 709, IBM 7090

External links 
 University of Michigan Executive System for the IBM 7090 Computer, volumes 1 (General, Utilities, Internal Organization), 2 (Translators), and 3 (Subroutine Libraries), Computing Center, University of Michigan, September 1965, 1050 pp.
 
 The IBM 7094 and CTSS, Tom Van Vleck
 University of Michigan Executive System (UMES) subseries, Computing Center publications, 1965-1999, Bentley Historical Library, University of Michigan, Ann Arbor, Michigan
 "A Markovian model of the University of Michigan Executive System", James D. Foey, Communications of the ACM, 1967, No.6

Discontinued operating systems
University of Michigan
1958 software
IBM mainframe operating systems